Angels of Death is a horror anime series adapted from a video game of the same title created by Makoto Sanada. The 16-episode series is produced by J.C.Staff and it premiered on July 6, 2018. The anime is directed by Kentarō Suzuki with scripts overseen by Yoshinobu Fujioka, music composed by Noisycroak at Lantis and character designs handled by Miki Matsumoto who is also serving as chief animation director. Masaaki Endoh performed the opening theme titled "Vital," while Haruka Chisuga performed the ending theme titled "Pray" under her character name Rachel. The series is also streamed on Crunchyroll with English subtitles, and Funimation in an English dub.


Episode list

Notes

References

External links

  
 Anime official website 
 
 

Episodes
Angels of Death (video game)